Roshagara is a 1992 Indian Kannada crime film directed by Om Sai Prakash who also penned the story for which the screenplay was written by Nanjunda. Produced by K. Sukumar, Upendra Kumar scored and composed the film's soundtrack. The film featured Devaraj , Anjana and Mukhyamantri Chandru in the lead roles.

Cast 
 Devaraj as Inspector Vijay
 Anjana as Priya
 Mukhyamantri Chandru as Dharmaraj
 Sihi Kahi Chandru as Kumar
 Thara as Sushama
 Tennis Krishna as Ramappa
 Ramesh Bhat as Jailer

Crew 
 Editor : P. Venkateshwara Rao
 Cinematography : Johny Lal
 Music : Upendra Kumar
 Lyrics : Chi. Udayashankar
 Dialogues : Chi. Udayashankar
 Story : Om Sai Prakash
 Screenplay : Nanjunda
 Director : Om Sai Prakash
 Producer : K. Sukumar

Synopsis 
Vijay kidnaps Sushama, the daughter of a well known social worker, Dharmaraj and threatens him not to inform anyone else. Sushama who is given the freedom to move within the room in which she is locked chances upon Vijay's personal diary. As the story cuts to a flashback it is revealed that Vijay, who was an honest police officer, locked horns with Dharmaraj who unknown to the public is a corrupt and crooked businessman. After initial altercations, Priya, the chief reporter in a prominent newspaper, falls in love with Vijay after he makes her realise how she was manipulated by Dharmaraj for his personal gains. But Vijay is still not ready to trust her. After happening to witness a murder Priya persuades to move to the crime scene only to be rebuffed since he believes it to be a prank. Dharmaraj, who had assigned goons to murder that person, fearing that Priya might pit him against the public and thereby destroy his reputation manages to frame her in a murder case and an attempted murder on Home Minister forcing Vijay to arrest her. The court rewards her death sentence causing her to believe that Vijay did this to her on purpose. Upon realising the truth Vijay quits his job and resolves to save her. The story cuts to the present with Sushama pledging to help Vijay in his mission. Vijay takes her back to her house. It is revealed that when Priya was once taken out of the prison Vijay sedated everyone and impregnated Priya without her knowledge since pregnant women should not be killed by the law. Dharmaraj, however, makes others believe that Priya's pregnancy is a ruse. He then decides to move to United States on the pretext of treatment with his daughter whom he discovers to be a spy of Vijay and only return a few days before elections. However, Sushama informs Vijay about Dharmaraj's plans. Vijay manages to trace Dharmaraj and stop him from travelling to the airport. After bashing his goons, he chases Dharmaraj to a hospital where Kumar, Dharmaraj's secretary happens to hold Priya as hostage. After rescuing Priya he beats Dharmaraj and with the support of Sushama produces him in the court. Proven guilty Dharmaraj's given a death penalty while Priya's sentence is revoked.

Soundtrack 

The soundtrack album scored and composed by Upendra Kumar with lyrics penned by Chi. Udayashankar comprises 4 tracks sung by Mano and Sangeetha Katti.

Single Tracks 
 Nanna Nudiyalli by Mano
 Ee Baalu Ennodu by Mano
 Oh Police Mr. Police by Sangeetha Katti

Duet 
 Ninna Kandaaga by Mano and Sangeetha Katti

Reference 

1990s Kannada-language films
1992 films
Indian action films
Films scored by Upendra Kumar
Films directed by Sai Prakash
1992 action films